Oke Kutumbam is a 1970 Indian Telugu-language drama film, produced by Ch. Raghava Rao and K. Basavaiah, presented by Nagabhushanam and directed by A. Bhimsingh. The film stars N. T. Rama Rao, Lakshmi and Kanta Rao, with music composed by S. P. Kodandapani. It is a remake of Bhimsingh's own Tamil film Paava Mannippu (1961).

Plot 
Martandam (Nagabhushanam) a jeweler and huge miser leads a happy family life with his wife Rajalakshmi (Rukmini) and two sons Chandram & Ramu. Once Martandam kills a Zamindar, steals his diamonds, and throws the blame on his driver Manikyam (Dhulipala). Knowing it, Manikyam's pregnant wife Kantham dies after giving birth to a baby girl. Rangamma (Nirmalamma) their neighbor rears Manikyam's elder daughter Seeta. James (Ch. Narayana Rao), a kindhearted millionaire, also the close friend of Martandam adopts the newborn baby and names her Mary. Meanwhile, Manikyam escapes from the police, kidnaps Martandam's younger son Ramu in revenge, and leaves him on the railway track, but he is rescued by a sahib Ismail (V. Nagayya). Thereafter, Manikyam is caught by Police and sentenced to 14 years. Ismail lives in the Martandam colony and dedicates his life to the people in that area. Years roll by, and Ramu grows up as Rahim (N. T. Rama Rao), possesses all the good qualities of Ismail, keeps harmony between people in the area and James takes care of their welfare. Chandram (Kanta Rao) & Mary (Lakshmi) grow together and Rajalakshmi wants to perform their marriage as a penance of her husband's sin. But Chandram & Mary do not have any such intention. Chandram loves Seeta (Rajasri) and Mary likes Rahim's ideologies and they too fall in love. At present, Martandam wants to sell his colony, which Rahim opposes and Martandam develops animosity with him. Meanwhile, Chandram leaves for police training when Martandam senses his love affair and warns Seeta. Before dying, Rangamma tells Seeta about the injustice Martandam did to their family. After that, Seeta tries to commit suicide, but Rahim saves and takes her to their colony.

In the meantime, Manikyam releases meet Rajalakshmi when she informs him regarding his younger daughter Mary and also that she is going to make her the daughter-in-law. Manikyam joins as the driver at James and they make marriage arrangements for Chandram & Mary which Mary refuses saying that she loves Rahim. To get rid of Rahim, Martandam pours acid on him and his face gets disfigured, nevertheless, Mary continues to love him. Simultaneously, Ismail becomes sick, on his deathbed revealing his birth secret Rahim. Parallelly, Martandam wants to grab the colony, so, he implicates Rahim in a false case, sends him to jail, and vacates them. Manikyam meets Rahim in jail, requests him to move out of Mary's life, and also confesses his sin when Rahim understands that he is Martandam's son. After release from jail, Rahim notices his colony people are starving with hunger, so, he gets some money requesting Rajalakshmi but Martandam gives a police complaint. Chandram goes to arrest him and he suspects Rahim & Seeta's relationship. Angered Chandram beats Rahim, and Rajyalakshmi stops him and tells the truth. In that conversation, they learn that Seeta is Manikyam's daughter when she meets her father. James too relates Mary to her father, Chandram also says sorry to Seeta and Rahim makes their marriage arrangements. During the time of marriage, Manikyam feels sorry and admits his mistake to Rajyalakshmi when they find out Rahim is only Ramu. Then, Martandam arrives to stop the marriage and Rahim obstructs his way, so, he sets Rahim on fire. At that moment, Manikyam & Rajalakshmi land and reveal the fact. Immediately Martandam rushes to protect Rahim but loses his eyesight and he says that it is has got the right punishment for his sins. He also orders Rahim to distribute his entire property to destitute people and surrenders himself. Finally, the entire family is reunited and the movie ends on a happy note with the marriage of Rahim & Mary.

Cast 
N. T. Rama Rao as Ramu / Rahim
Lakshmi as Mary
Kanta Rao as Chandram
Nagabhushanam as Marthandam
V. Nagayya as Ismail
Dhulipala as Manikhyam
Allu Ramalingaiah as Kodandam
Padmanabham as Kavi
Raja Babu as Vaali Hanumantha Sastry
Ch Narayana Rao as James
Ramana Murthy as Foreigner
Sakshi Ranga Rao
Rajasree as Seeta
Jayshree T. as Dancer
Rukmini as Rajyalakshmi
Nirmalamma as Rangamma

Soundtrack 
Music composed by  S. P. Kodandapani.

References

External links 
 

Films directed by A. Bhimsingh
Indian drama films
Telugu remakes of Tamil films